Rollin P. Eckis ( – November 12, 1999) was an American geologist and oil company executive. He helped discover oil fields in California and Alaska.

References

20th-century American geologists
American businesspeople in the oil industry
Pomona College alumni
San Diego State University alumni
1900s births
1999 deaths
Year of birth uncertain